Madame Tussauds Istanbul is a wax museum and tourist attraction located on İstiklal Avenue in Istanbul. It is the twenty first location for the Tussauds, which was set up by sculptor Marie Tussaud. Madame Tussauds is owned and operated by Merlin Entertainments.

Wax figures

History and leaders

Science and culture

Cinema

Sports

Music

VIP Party

Upcoming

Removed

See also 
Chamber of Horrors (Madame Tussauds), London
Marie Tussaud
Madame Tussauds Delhi
Madame Tussauds Hollywood
Madame Tussauds Hong Kong
Madame Tussauds Las Vegas
Madame Tussauds New York
 Madame Tussauds Rock Circus (1989–2001, London)
Madame Tussauds San Francisco
Madame Tussauds Shanghai
Madame Tussauds Singapore
Madame Tussauds Sydney
Madame Tussauds Washington D.C.
Merlin Entertainments

References